"We Be Burnin'" is the first single from Jamaican musician Sean Paul's third studio album, The Trinity (2005). It achieved success worldwide, becoming a top-10 hit on at least 10 national music charts, including those of Germany, Italy, the United Kingdom, and the United States.

Background and release
"We Be Burnin'" was released as the first single from The Trinity on 22 August 2005 in the US and on 12 September 2005 in the UK. In the US, the single peaked inside the Billboard Hot 100 at number six, and in the UK, the single peaking at number two. The single became his biggest solo hit in the UK, beating the number-three peak of "Like Glue" in 2003 and spending just under five months inside the UK top 75. It was the biggest hit from the album in the UK; however, it was "Temperature" that was the biggest hit from the album in the US.

The original version, sometimes denoted by the title being followed by "Legalize It", features prominent themes of marijuana use, referencing "trees", "weed" and "herb" several times and smoking it for "meditation". Another radio-friendly version was released with the title being followed by "Recognize It", which changed all drug-related lyrics to ones concerning women.

Although the lyrics are different, Tami Chynn's single "Hyperventilating" as well as Capleton's "Or Wah" from the album Reign of Fire utilize the same riddim as Sean Paul's "We Be Burnin'", since both use the riddim "Stepz".

Music video
The video was shot in Southern California deserts by Jessy Terrero, showing dancers accompanying Paul, and two girls in an overheated Hummer H2. Sean Paul is seen dancing with three other girls in front of highly modified trucks.

Track listings

US 12-inch single
A1. "We Be Burnin'" (Legalize It club version)	– 3:28
A2. "We Be Burnin'" (instrumental)	– 3:52
B1. "We Be Burnin'" (Recognize It radio version) – 3:36
B2. "We Be Burnin'" (instrumental)	– 3:53

UK CD1 and European CD single
 "We Be Burnin'" (Recognize It)
 "We Be Burnin'" (Legalize It)

UK CD2
 "We Be Burnin'" (Recognize It)
 "Bounce It Right There"
 "We Be Burnin" (video)
 Ringtone

UK 12-inch single
A1. "We Be Burnin'" (Recognize It)
A2. "We Be Burnin'" (instrumental)
B1. "We Be Burnin'" (Legalize It)
B2. "Bounce It Right There"

Australian CD single
 "We Be Burnin'" (Recognize It)
 "Bounce It Right There"
 "We Be Burnin'" (Legalize It)

Charts

Weekly charts

Year-end charts

Certifications

!scope="col" colspan="3"| Ringtone
|-

Release history

References

Sean Paul songs
2005 singles
2005 songs
Atlantic Records singles
Music videos directed by Jessy Terrero
Songs about cannabis
Songs written by Sean Paul
Songs written by Steven "Lenky" Marsden
VP Records singles